Proserpinaca, commonly called mermaidweed, is a genus of flowering plants in the watermilfoil family (Haloragaceae). It is a small genus, comprising only two to three extant species, all of which are native to eastern North America and the West Indies. All species in this genus are found in aquatic or terrestrial wetland habitats.

Proserpinaca can be distinguished from its relative Myriophyllum by having 3 stamens and carpels per flower (as opposed to having 4 or 8).

Species
Two or three extant species are known from this genus, depending on the treatment. They are:
Proserpinaca intermedia - Uncommon in the southeastern U.S.; intermediate in characteristics, and it is unclear if it is best treated as a hybrid
Proserpinaca palustris - Widespread in eastern North America and the West Indies
Proserpinaca pectinata - Native primarily to the Southeast Coastal Plain, with disjunct populations in middle Tennessee

Fossil record
15 fossil fruits of †Proserpinaca ervinii from the early Miocene, have been found in the Kristina Mine at Hrádek nad Nisou in North Bohemia, the Czech Republic. Two fossil fruits  of †Proserpinaca previcarpa have been described from middle Miocene strata of the Fasterholt area near Silkeborg in Central Jutland, Denmark.

References

Saxifragales genera
Haloragaceae